Littleport may refer to:
Littleport, Cambridgeshire, England
Littleport, Iowa, United States